Bookmaker Ratings is an online publication covering topics related to sports betting and disputes between players and bookmakers. It is published in seven languages: English, Armenian, Bulgarian, Russian, Serbian, Spanish and Ukrainian.

History and activity 
The Bookmaker Ratings was founded by Paruyr Shahbazyan in 2012. Later that year, the site made headlines after being informed of a possible match-fixing incident in the Russian National Football League between FC Khimki and Petrotrest St. Petersburg, and UEFA asked them to investigate.

The website publishes betting tips for various sports written by the site's authors who range from journalists to ex-players. These authors include commentator Konstantin Genich, former world number 5 tennis player Anna Chakvetadze, football manager of the Russian national team Valeri Karpin, and Russian football coach and a former player Yegor Titov. Other experts in the past have included football World Cup winner Fabio Cannavaro and former heavyweight boxing champion Nikolai Valuev. According to a 2015 interview of Shahbazyan for Forbes, Bookmaker Ratings averaged 1.2 million hits a month, 350,000 of which were unique visitors. The site uses an independent rating system where bookmakers are ranked from 1 to 5 on several criteria.

The site was able to refund more than 1.4m US dollars to players in their first four years of existence.

Award 
In 2018, the Bookmaker Ratings established its own international Award in sports and betting. The awards are given in 28 nominations. In 2021, football player Luis Figo announced the main nominations for the award. Fonbet became the bookmaker of the year and Artem Dzyuba became the sportsman of the year.

Honours 
 Betting Awards 2015 - Winner, "Best internet portal about sports betting"
 Betting Awards 2016 - Winner, "Best internet portal about sports betting"
 iGB Affiliate Awards 2017 - Shortlisted, "Best Site in a Foreign Language"
 Runet Prize 2018 - Winner, "Media and entertainment"

References

External links
 Official website

2012 establishments
Sports betting
Bookmakers